The Democratic Youth Federation of Kiskunfélegyháza (Fédisz), was a local political party based in Kiskunfélegyháza, Hungary.

History
The Fédisz initially founded as an autonomous regional branch of the Hungarian Democratic Youth League (DEMISZ) in Kiskunfélegyháza, the short-lived successor organization of the Hungarian Young Communist League (KISZ). Its first congress elected physician István Garai as leader of the organization. The Fédisz's programme represented the idea of democratic socialism while rejected the rapid political and economical transformation from Communist party state to political pluralism.

Soon the Fédisz transformed itself as a party to the 1990 parliamentary election. They made an electoral coalition with the local Regional Democratic Youth Alliance (Tedisz) from Kiskunmajsa, the two parties had only one individual candidate, István Levente Garai, who received only 0.08 percent of the votes. The two parties broke up shortly thereafter.

Election results

National Assembly

References

Sources

Defunct political parties in Hungary
Political parties established in 1989
Political parties disestablished in 1990
1989 establishments in Hungary
1990 disestablishments in Hungary